The men's individual time trial (ITT) was held on 10 October 1996 in Lugano, Switzerland. The host nation claimed 2 medals as the reigning Vuelta a España champion, Alex Zülle took the rainbow jersey ahead of 1994 champion Chris Boardman and compatriot Tony Rominger.

Final classification

References
autobus.cyclingnews.com

Men's time trial
UCI Road World Championships – Men's time trial